Kevlar KM2 is a synthetic para-aramid fibre produced by DuPont. The fiber is an evolution of the original Kevlar fibre. The following quotes summarise Kevlar KM2's properties.

"DuPont created Kevlar KM2 to achieve the performance goals defined by casualty reduction testing for the Department of Defense. Today it is used extensively for fragmentation protection in the U.S. military. Helmets and vests made with Kevlar KM2 provide enhanced bullet and fragmentation resistance while remaining comfortable and breathable in the most inhospitable climates.

Excellent thermal stability at temperature extremes, water repellency, chemical stability and resistance to petroleum products have made Kevlar KM2 an indispensable asset to the military personnel who use it every day."

"Kevlar KM2 fiber is a transversely isotropic material. Its tensile stress–strain response in the axial direction is linear and elastic until failure. However, the overall deformation in the transverse directions is nonlinear and nonelastic, although it can be treated linearly and elastically in infinitesimal strain range. For a linear, elastic, and transversely isotropic material, five material constants are needed to describe its stress–strain response."

References

Organic polymers
Body armor
Synthetic fibers
Brand name materials